, born Patrick Lafcadio Hearn, was a Greek-Japanese writer, translator, and teacher who introduced the culture and literature of Japan to the West. His writings offered unprecedented insight into Japanese culture, especially his collections of legends and ghost stories, such as Kwaidan: Stories and Studies of Strange Things. Before moving to Japan and becoming a Japanese citizen, he worked as a journalist in the United States, primarily in Cincinnati and New Orleans. His writings about New Orleans, based on his decade-long stay there, are also well-known.

Hearn was born on the Greek island of Lefkada, after which a complex series of conflicts and events led to his being moved to Dublin, where he was abandoned first by his mother, then his father, and finally by his father's aunt (who had been appointed his official guardian). At the age of 19, he emigrated to the United States, where he found work as a newspaper reporter, first in Cincinnati and later in New Orleans. From there, he was sent as a correspondent to the French West Indies, where he stayed for two years, and then to Japan, where he would remain for the rest of his life.

In Japan, Hearn married a Japanese woman with whom he had four children. His writings about Japan offered the Western world a glimpse into a fascinating culture largely unknown in the West at the time.

Biography

Early life
Patrick Lafcadio Hearn was born on the Greek Ionian Island of Lefkada on 27 June 1850, His mother was a Greek named Rosa Cassimati and she was a native of the Greek island of Kythira, while his father was a British Army officer of either English, Irish, or mixed Anglo-Irish descent, who was stationed in Lefkada during the British protectorate of the United States of the Ionian Islands. Throughout his life, Lafcadio boasted of his Greek blood and had a passionate leaning towards Greece. He was baptized Patrikios Lefcadios Hearn (Greek: Πατρίκιος Λευκάδιος Χερν) in the Greek Orthodox Church, but he seems to have been called "Patrick Lefcadio Kassimati Charles Hearn" in English; and, the middle name "Lafcadio" was given to him in honour of the island where he was born. Hearn's parents were married in a Greek Orthodox ceremony on 25 November 1849, several months after his mother had given birth to Hearn's older brother, George Robert Hearn, on 24 July 1849. George died on 17 August 1850, two months after Lafcadio's birth.

Emigration to Ireland and abandonment

Hearn's father Charles was promoted to Staff Surgeon Second Class and in 1850 was reassigned from Lefkada to the British West Indies. Since his family did not approve of the marriage, and because he was worried that his relationship might harm his career prospects, Charles did not inform his superiors of his son or pregnant wife and left his family behind. In 1852, he arranged to send his son and wife to live with his family in Dublin, where they received a cool reception. Hearn's Protestant mother, Elizabeth Holmes Hearn, had difficulty accepting Rosa's Greek Orthodox views and lack of education (she was illiterate and spoke no English). Rosa found it difficult to adapt to a foreign culture and the Protestantism of her husband's family, and was eventually taken under the wing of Elizabeth's sister, Sarah Holmes Brenane, a widow who had converted to Catholicism.

Despite Sarah's efforts, Rosa suffered from homesickness. When her husband returned to Ireland on medical leave in 1853, it became clear that the couple had become estranged. Charles Hearn was assigned to the Crimean Peninsula, again leaving his pregnant wife and child in Ireland. When he came back in 1856, severely wounded and traumatized, Rosa had returned to her home island of Cerigo in Greece, where she gave birth to their third son, Daniel James Hearn. Lafcadio had been left in the care of Sarah Brenane.

Charles petitioned to have the marriage with Rosa annulled, on the basis of her lack of signature on the marriage contract, which made it invalid under English law. After being informed of the annulment, Rosa almost immediately married Giovanni Cavallini, a Greek citizen of Italian ancestry who was later appointed by the British as governor of Cerigotto. Cavallini required as a condition of the marriage that Rosa give up custody of both Lafcadio and James. As a result, James was sent to his father in Dublin and Lafcadio remained in the care of Sarah, who had disinherited Charles because of the annulment. Neither Lafcadio nor James saw their mother again, who had four children with her second husband. Rosa was eventually committed to the National Mental Asylum on Corfu, where she died in 1882.

Charles Hearn, who had left Lafcadio in the care of Sarah Brenane for the past four years, now appointed her as Lafcadio's permanent guardian. He married his childhood sweetheart, Alicia Goslin, in July 1857, and left with his new wife for a posting in Secunderabad, where they had three daughters prior to Alicia's death in 1861. Lafcadio never saw his father again: Charles Hearn died of malaria in the Gulf of Suez in 1866.

In 1857, at age seven and despite the fact that both his parents were still alive, Hearn became the permanent ward of his great aunt, Sarah Brenane. She divided her residency between Dublin in the winter months, her husband's estate at Tramore, County Waterford, on the southern Irish coast, and a house at Bangor, North Wales. Brenane also engaged a tutor during the school year to provide basic instruction and the rudiments of Catholic dogma. Hearn began exploring Brenane's library and read extensively in Greek literature, especially myths.

Catholic education and more abandonment

In 1861, Hearn's aunt, aware that Hearn was turning away from Catholicism, and at the urging of Henry Hearn Molyneux, a relative of her late husband and a distant cousin of Hearn, enrolled him at the Institution Ecclésiastique, a Catholic church school in Yvetot, France. Hearn's experiences at the school confirmed his lifelong conviction that Catholic education consisted of "conventional dreariness and ugliness and dirty austerities and long faces and Jesuitry and infamous distortion of children's brains." Hearn became fluent in French and would later translate into English the works of Guy de Maupassant and Gustave Flaubert.

In 1863, again at the suggestion of Molyneux, Hearn was enrolled at St. Cuthbert's College, Ushaw, a Catholic seminary at what is now the University of Durham. In this environment, Hearn adopted the nickname "Paddy" to try to fit in better, and was the top student in English composition for three years. At age 16, while at Ushaw, Hearn injured his left eye in a schoolyard mishap. The eye became infected and, despite consultations with specialists in Dublin and London, and a year spent out of school convalescing, went blind. Hearn also suffered from severe myopia, so his injury left him permanently with poor vision, requiring him to carry a magnifying glass for close work and a pocket telescope to see anything beyond a short distance (Hearn avoided eyeglasses, believing they would gradually weaken his vision further). The iris was permanently discolored, and left Hearn self-conscious about his appearance for the rest of his life, causing him to cover his left eye while conversing and always posing for the camera in profile so that the left eye was not visible.

In 1867, Henry Molyneux, who had become Sarah Brenane's financial manager, went bankrupt, along with Brenane. There was no money for tuition, and Hearn was sent to London's East End to live with Brenane's former maid. She and her husband had little time or money for Hearn, who wandered the streets, spent time in workhouses, and generally lived an aimless, rootless existence. His main intellectual activities consisted of visits to libraries and the British Museum.

Emigration to Cincinnati
By 1869, Henry Molyneux had recovered some financial stability and Brenane, now 75, was infirm. Resolving to end his expenditures on the 19-year-old Hearn, he purchased a one-way ticket to New York and instructed Hearn to find his way to Cincinnati, to locate Molyneux's sister and her husband, Thomas Cullinan, and to obtain their assistance in making a living. Upon meeting Hearn in Cincinnati, the family had little assistance to offer: Cullinan gave him $5 and wished him luck in seeking his fortune. As Hearn would later write, "I was dropped moneyless on the pavement of an American city to begin life."

For a time, he was impoverished, living in stables or store rooms in exchange for menial labor. He eventually befriended the English printer and communalist Henry Watkin, who employed him in his printing business, helped find him various odd jobs, lent him books from his library, including utopianists Fourier, Dixon and Noyes, and gave Hearn a nickname which stuck with him for the rest of his life, The Raven, from the Poe poem. Hearn also frequented the Cincinnati Public Library, which at that time had an estimated 50,000 volumes. In the spring of 1871 a letter from Henry Molyneux informed him of Sarah Brenane's death and Molyneux's appointment as sole executor. Despite Brenane having named him as the beneficiary of an annuity when she became his guardian, Hearn received nothing from the estate and never heard from Molyneux again.

Newspaper and literary work

By the strength of his talent as a writer, Hearn obtained a job as a reporter for the Cincinnati Daily Enquirer, working for the newspaper from 1872 to 1875. Writing with creative freedom in one of Cincinnati's largest circulating newspapers, he became known for his lurid accounts of local murders, developing a reputation as the paper's premier sensational journalist, as well as the author of sensitive accounts of some of the disadvantaged people of Cincinnati. The Library of America selected one of these murder accounts, Gibbeted, for inclusion in its two-century retrospective of American True Crime, published in 2008. After one of his murder stories, the Tanyard Murder, had run for several months in 1874, Hearn established his reputation as Cincinnati's most audacious journalist, and the Enquirer raised his salary from $10 to $25 per week.

In 1874, Hearn and the young Henry Farny, later a renowned painter of the American West, wrote, illustrated, and published an 8-page weekly journal of art, literature and satire entitled Ye Giglampz. The Cincinnati Public Library reprinted a facsimile of all nine issues in 1983. The work was considered by a twentieth century critic to be "Perhaps the most fascinating sustained project he undertook as an editor."

Marriage and firing by the Enquirer
On 14 June 1874, Hearn, aged 23, married Alethea ("Mattie") Foley, a 20-year-old African American woman, and former slave, an action in violation of Ohio's anti-miscegenation law at that time. In August 1875, in response to complaints from a local clergyman about his anti-religious views and pressure from local politicians embarrassed by some of his satirical writing in Ye Giglampz, the Enquirer fired him, citing as its reason his illegal marriage. He went to work for the rival newspaper The Cincinnati Commercial. The Enquirer offered to re-hire him after his stories began appearing in the Commercial and its circulation began increasing, but Hearn, incensed at the paper's behavior, refused. Hearn and Foley separated, but attempted reconciliation several times before divorcing in 1877. Foley remarried in 1880. While working for the Commercial he championed the case of Henrietta Wood, a former slave who won a major reparations case.

While working for the Commercial Hearn agreed to be carried to the top of Cincinnati's tallest building on the back of a famous steeplejack, Joseph Roderiguez Weston, and wrote a half-terrified, half-comic account of the experience. It was also during this time that Hearn wrote a series of accounts of the Bucktown and Levee neighborhoods of Cincinnati, "...one of the few depictions we have of black life in a border city during the post-Civil War period." He also wrote about local black song lyrics from the era, including a song titled "Shiloh" that was dedicated to a Bucktown resident named "Limber Jim." In addition, Hearn had printed in the Commercial a stanza he had overheard when listening to the songs of the roustabouts, working on the city's levee waterfront. Similar stanzas were recorded in song by Julius Daniels in 1926 and Tommy McClennan in his version of "Bottle Up and Go" (1939).

Move to New Orleans

During the autumn of 1877, recently divorced from Mattie Foley and restless, Hearn had begun neglecting his newspaper work in favor of translating into English works of the French author Gautier. He had also grown increasingly disenchanted with Cincinnati, writing to Henry Watkin, "It is time for a fellow to get out of Cincinnati when they begin to call it the Paris of America." With the support of Watkin and Cincinnati Commercial publisher Murat Halstead, Hearn left Cincinnati for New Orleans, where he initially wrote dispatches on the "Gateway to the Tropics" for the Commercial.

Hearn lived in New Orleans for nearly a decade, writing first for the newspaper Daily City Item beginning in June 1878, and later for the Times Democrat. Since the Item was a 4-page publication, Hearn's editorial work changed the character of the newspaper dramatically. He began at the Item as a news editor, expanding to include book reviews of Bret Harte and Émile Zola, summaries of pieces in national magazines such as Harper's, and editorial pieces introducing Buddhism and Sanskrit writings. As editor, Hearn created and published nearly two hundred woodcuts of daily life and people in New Orleans, making the Item the first Southern newspaper to introduce cartoons and giving the paper an immediate boost in circulation. Hearn gave up carving the woodcuts after six months when he found the strain was too great for his eye.

At the end of 1881, Hearn took an editorial position with the New Orleans Times Democrat and was employed translating items from French and Spanish newspapers as well as writing editorials and cultural reviews on topics of his choice. He also continued his work translating French authors into English: Gérard de Nerval, Anatole France, and most notably Pierre Loti, an author who influenced Hearn's own writing style. Milton Bronner, who edited Hearn's letters to Henry Watkin, wrote: "[T]he Hearn of New Orleans was the father of the Hearn of the West Indies and of Japan," and this view was endorsed by Norman Foerster. During his tenure at the Times Democrat, Hearn also developed a friendship with editor Page Baker, who went on to champion Hearn's literary career; their correspondence is archived at the Loyola University New Orleans Special Collections & Archives.

The vast number of his writings about New Orleans and its environs, many of which have not been collected, include the city's Creole population and distinctive cuisine, the French Opera, and Louisiana Voodoo. Hearn wrote enthusiastically of New Orleans, but also wrote of the city's decay, "a dead bride crowned with orange flowers".

Hearn's writings for national publications, such as Harper's Weekly and Scribner's Magazine, helped create the popular reputation of New Orleans as a place with a distinctive culture more akin to that of Europe and the Caribbean than to the rest of North America. Hearn's best-known Louisiana works include: 
 Gombo zhèbes: Little dictionary of Creole proverbs (1885)
 La Cuisine Créole (1885), a collection of culinary recipes from leading chefs and noted Creole housewives who helped make New Orleans famous for its cuisine
 Chita: A Memory of Last Island (1889), a novella based on the hurricane of 1856 first published in Harper's Monthly in 1888

Hearn also published in Harper's Weekly the first known written article (1883) about Filipinos in the United States, the Manilamen or Tagalogs, one of whose villages he had visited at Saint Malo, southeast of Lake Borgne in St. Bernard Parish, Louisiana.

At the time he lived there, Hearn was little known, and even now he is little known for his writing about New Orleans, except by local cultural devotees. However, more books have been written about him than any former resident of New Orleans except Louis Armstrong.

Hearn's writings for the New Orleans newspapers included impressionistic descriptions of places and characters and many editorials denouncing political corruption, street crime, violence, intolerance, and the failures of public health and hygiene officials. Despite the fact that he is credited with "inventing" New Orleans as an exotic and mysterious place, his obituaries of the vodou leaders Marie Laveau and Doctor John Montenet are matter-of-fact and debunking. Selections of Hearn's New Orleans writings have been collected and published in several works, starting with Creole Sketches in 1924, and more recently in Inventing New Orleans: Writings of Lafcadio Hearn.

Move to the French West Indies

Harper's sent Hearn to the West Indies as a correspondent in 1887. He spent two years in Martinique and in addition to his writings for the magazine, produced two books: Two Years in the French West Indies and Youma, The Story of a West-Indian Slave, both published in 1890.

Later life in Japan

In 1890, Hearn went to Japan with a commission as a newspaper correspondent, which was quickly terminated. It was in Japan, however, that he found a home and his greatest inspiration. Through the good will of Basil Hall Chamberlain, Hearn gained a teaching position during the summer of 1890 at the Shimane Prefectural Common Middle School and Normal School in Matsue, a town in western Japan on the coast of the Sea of Japan. During his fifteen-month stay in Matsue, Hearn married Koizumi Setsuko, the daughter of a local samurai family, with whom he had four children: Kazuo, Iwao, Kiyoshi, and Suzuko. He became a Japanese citizen, assuming the legal name Koizumi Yakumo in 1896 after accepting a teaching position in Tokyo; Koizumi is his wife's surname and Yakumo is from yakumotatsu, a poetic modifier word (makurakotoba) for Izumo Province, which he translated as "the Place of the Issuing of Clouds". After having been Greek Orthodox, Roman Catholic, and, later on, Spencerian, he became Buddhist.

During late 1891, Hearn obtained another teaching position in Kumamoto, at the Fifth High Middle School (a predecessor of Kumamoto University), where he spent the next three years and completed his book Glimpses of Unfamiliar Japan (1894). In October 1894, he secured a journalism job with the English-language newspaper Kobe Chronicle, and in 1896, with some assistance from Chamberlain, he began teaching English literature at Tokyo Imperial University, a job he had until 1903. In 1904, he was a lecturer at Waseda University.

While in Japan, he encountered the art of ju-jutsu which made a deep impression upon him: "Hearn, who encountered judo in Japan at the end of the nineteenth century, contemplated its concepts with the awed tones of an explorer staring about him in an extraordinary and undiscovered land. "What Western brain could have elaborated this strange teaching, never to oppose force by force, but only direct and utilize the power of attack; to overthrow the enemy solely through his own strength, to vanquish him solely by his own efforts? Surely none! The Western mind appears to work in straight lines; the Oriental, in wonderful curves and circles." When he was teaching at the Fifth High Middle School, the headmaster was founder of Judo Kano Jigoro himself.

On 26 September 1904, Hearn died of heart failure in Tokyo at the age of 54. His grave is at the Zōshigaya Cemetery in Tokyo's Toshima district.

Legacy

Literary tradition
In the late 19th century, Japan was still largely unknown and exotic to Westerners. However, with the introduction of Japanese aesthetics, particularly at the Paris Exposition Universelle of 1900, Japanese styles became fashionable in Western countries. Consequently, Hearn became known to the world by his writings concerning Japan. In later years, some critics would accuse Hearn of exoticizing Japan, but because he offered the West some of its first descriptions of pre-industrial and Meiji Era Japan, his work is generally regarded as having historical value.

Admirers of Hearn's work have included Ben Hecht, John Erskine, Malcolm Cowley and Jorge Luis Borges.

Hearn was a major translator of the short stories of Guy de Maupassant.

Yone Noguchi is quoted as saying about Hearn, "His Greek temperament and French culture became frost-bitten as a flower in the North."

Hearn won a wide following in Japan, where his books were translated and remain popular to the present day. Hearn's appeal to Japanese readers "lies in the glimpses he offered of an older, more mystical Japan lost during the country’s hectic plunge into Western-style industrialization and nation building. His books are treasured here as a trove of legends and folk tales that otherwise might have vanished because no Japanese had bothered to record them."

Museums
The Lafcadio Hearn Memorial Museum and his old residence in Matsue are still two of the city's most popular tourist attractions. In addition, another small museum dedicated to Hearn opened in Yaizu, Shizuoka, in 2007 (:ja:焼津小泉八雲記念館).

The first museum in Europe for Lafcadio Hearn was inaugurated in Lefkada, Greece, his birthplace, on 4 July 2014, as Lefcadio Hearn Historical Center. It contains early editions, rare books and Japanese collectibles. The visitors, through photos, texts and exhibits, can wander in the significant events of Lafcadio Hearn's life, but also in the civilizations of Europe, America and Japan of the late eighteenth and early nineteenth centuries through his lectures, writings and tales. The municipalities of Kumamoto, Matsue, Shinjuku, Yaizu, Toyama University, the Koizumi family and other people from Japan and Greece contributed to the establishment of Lefcadio Hearn Historical Center.

On a trip to Matsue in 2012, Professor Bon Koizumi (Hearn's great-grandson) and his wife Shoko were introduced by keen supporters of Lafcadio to Dublin-based Motoko Fujita, a published photographer of The Shadow of James Joyce (Lilliput Press Ltd., Ireland, 2011) and the founder of the Experience Japan Festival in Dublin. Acting on the Koizumi's desire to reconnect with their Irish roots, Fujita then coordinated a trip for Bon and Shoko in autumn 2013, during which key relationships to more Lafcadio supporters in Ireland were forged. Fujita's initiative led to the exhibition Coming Home: The Open Mind of Patrick Lafcadio Hearn at The Little Museum of Dublin (15 October 2015 to 3 January 2016), the first time Hearn was honoured in the city. The exhibit contained first editions of Hearn's works and personal items from the Lafcadio Hearn Memorial Museum. Professor Bon Koizumi was in attendance at the opening of the exhibition. Fujita also initiated the planning of a Japanese garden in Hearn's honour, and in 2015 the Lafcadio Hearn Japanese Gardens in Tramore, Co. Waterford opened. 
There is also a cultural centre named after Hearn at the University of Durham, where in 2022 a conference Lafcadio Hearn and the Global Imagination at the Fin de Siècle was held.

Sister cities
His life journey later connected its both ends; Lefkada and Shinjuku became sister cities in 1989. Another pair of cities he lived in, New Orleans and Matsue did the same in 1994.

Media and theater
The Japanese director Masaki Kobayashi adapted four Hearn tales into his 1964 film, Kwaidan. Some of his stories have been adapted by Ping Chong into his puppet theatre, including the 1999 Kwaidan and the 2002 OBON: Tales of Moonlight and Rain.

In 1984, four episode Japanese TV series Nihon no omokage (:ja:日本の面影, Remnants of Japan), depicting Hearn's departure from the United States and later life in Japan, was broadcast with Greek-American actor George Chakiris as Hearn. The story was later adapted to theatrical productions.

The video game series Touhou Project is influenced by Hearn's works. This doujin soft series is about a fantasy world known as "Gensokyo, separated from "our" world with a magical barrier. Two of its most important characters, Yukari Yakumo and Maribel Hearn, are references to Lafcadio Hearn. Yukari is a powerful Yōkai who helped create the border separating Gensokyo from the outside world, and Maribel Hearn is a college student who lives in Kyoto who is able to see Gensokyo in her dreams. These two characters are implied to be related or even the same person, but what their relationship is exactly is unknown. Yukari Yakumo appears in many Touhou games, books, and manga, and Maribel appears in the stories included in ZUN's music collection, a series of albums.

Works

Louisiana subjects
 La Cuisine Creole: A Collection of Culinary Recipes (1885)
 "Gombo Zhèbes": A Little Dictionary of Creole Proverbs, Selected from Six Creole Dialects. (1885)
 Chita: A Memory of Last Island (1889)
 Creole Sketches (1878-1880; published 1924)  pdf full text

West Indies subjects
 Youma: The Story of a West-Indian Slave (1889)
 Two Years in the French West Indies (1890)

Japanese subjects
Source:
 Glimpses of Unfamiliar Japan (1894)
 Out of the East: Reveries and Studies in New Japan (1895)
 Kokoro: Hints and Echoes of Japanese Inner Life (1896) pdf; free full text
 Gleanings in Buddha-Fields: Studies of Hand and Soul in the Far East (1897)
 The Boy Who Drew Cats (1897)
 Exotics and Retrospectives (1898)
 Japanese Fairy Tales (1898, and sequels)
 In Ghostly Japan (1899)
 Shadowings (1900)
 Japanese Lyrics (1900)
 A Japanese Miscellany (1901)
 Kottō: Being Japanese Curios, with Sundry Cobwebs (1902)
 Kwaidan: Stories and Studies of Strange Things (1904)
 Japan: An Attempt at Interpretation (1904)
 The Romance of the Milky Way and Other Studies and Stories (1905)

Posthumous anthologies
 Letters from the Raven: Being the Correspondence of Lafcadio Hearn with Henry Watkin (1907), includes Letters from the Raven, Letters to a Lady, Letters of Ozias Midwinter
 Leaves from the Diary of an Impressionist (1911, Houghton Mifflin Company)
 Interpretations of Literature (1915, Dodd, Mead and Company).  This is a selection of his University of Tokyo lectures (1896-1902).
 Appreciations of Poetry (London: William Heinemann, 1916). This is a further selection from his University of Tokyo lectures (1896-1902).
 Karma (1918)
 On Reading in Relation to Literature (1921, The Atlantic Monthly Press, Inc.)
 Creole Sketches (1924, Houghton Mifflin)
 Lectures on Shakespeare (1928, Hokuseido Press)
 Insect-Musicians and Other Stories and Sketches (1929)
 Japan's Religions: Shinto and Buddhism (1966)
 Books and Habits; from the Lectures of Lafcadio Hearn (1968, Books for Libraries Press)
 Writings from Japan: An Anthology (1984, Penguin Books)
 Lafcadio Hearn's America: Ethnographic Sketches and Editorials (2002, University Press of Kentucky)
 Lafcadio Hearn's Japan: An Anthology of His Writings on the Country and Its People (2007, Tuttle)
 American Writings (2009, Library of America)
 Nightmare-Touch (2010, Tartarus Press)
 Insect Literature (2015, Swan River Press; for details, see Insects in literature)
 Japanese Ghost Stories. Murray, Paul, ed. 2019 London: Penguin. 
 Japanese Tales of Lafcadio Hearn. Andrei Codrescu, ed. 2019. Princeton: Princeton University Press.

Translations
 One of Cleopatra's Nights and Other Fantastic Romances by Théophile Gautier (1882) 
 Tales from Theophile Gautier (1888) 
 The Crime of Sylvestre Bonnard by Anatole France (1890) 
 The Temptation of Saint Anthony by Gustave Flaubert (1910)
 Stories from Emile Zola (1935)
 The Tales of Guy de Maupassant (1964)

Other
 Stray Leaves From Strange Literature: Stories Reconstructed from the Anvari-Soheili, Baital Pachisi, Mahabharata, Pantchantra, Gulistan, Talmud, Kalewala, etc. (1884, James R. Osgood and Company)
 Some Chinese Ghosts (1887)

See also

 Lafcadio Hearn Memorial Museum
 Goryo Hamaguchi

References

Further reading

 Amenomori, Nobushige (1905). "Lafcadio Hearn, the Man," The Atlantic Monthly, October 1905.
 Bisland, Elizabeth (1906). The Life and Letters of Lafcadio Hearn, Vol. II, New York: Houghton, Mifflin & Company.
 Bronner, Simon J. 2002.  Lafcadio Hearn's America: Ethnographic Sketches and Editorials. Lexington: University Press of Kentucky.
 .
 Dawson, Carl (1992). Lafcadio Hearn and the Vision of Japan, Johns Hopkins University Press.
 .
Hirakawa, Sukehiro and Yoko Makino (2018), What is Shintō? Japan, a Country of Gods, as Seen by Lafcadio Hearn, Tokyo: Kinseisha.
 .
 Kunst, Arthur E. (1969). Lafcadio Hearn, Twayne Publishers.
 Langton, D. H. (1912). "Lafcadio Hearn: Journalist and Writer on Japan," The Manchester Quarterly, Vol. XXXI.
 .
 Mais, S. P. B. (1920). "Lafcadio Hearn." In Books and their Writers, Grant Richards, Ltd.
 McWilliams, Vera (1946). Lafcadio Hearn, Houghton Mifflin Company.
 Miner, Earl Roy (1958). The Japanese Tradition in British and American Literature, Princeton University Press.
 Monaham, Michael (1922). "Lafcadio Hearn," An Attic Dreamer, Mitchell Kennerley.
 More, Paul Elmer (1905). "Lafcadio Hearn." In Shelburne Essays, Second Series, G. P. Putnam's Sons.
 Murray, Paul (1993). A Fantastic Journey: The Life and Literature of Lafcadio Hearn, Japan Library.
 Noguchi, Yone (1905). "Lafcadio Hearn, A Dreamer," National Magazine, Vol. XXII, No. 1.
 .
 .
 .
 Setsu, Koizumi (1918). Reminiscences of Lafcadio Hearn, Houghton Mifflin Company.
 .
 Stevenson, Elizabeth (1961). Lafcadio Hearn, Macmillan New York
 Thomas, Edward (1912). Lafcadio Hearn, Houghton Mifflin Company.
Murray, Paul, ed. 2019. Japanese Ghost Stories. Lafcadio Hearn. London: Penguin. 
Hearn, Lafcadio. 2019. Kwaidan: Stories and Studies of Strange Things. By. 2019. Chicago: University of Chicago Press.  (soft cover).

External links

 Lafcadio Hearn Memorial Museum Matsue city in Japan
 Lafcadio Hearn History Center Lefkada in Greece
 Lafcadio Hearn Gardens Tramore in Ireland
 Hearn's Works, by T Russel
 
 
 
 
 Works by Lafcadio Hearn, at Hathi Trust
 .
 Hearn's influence in literature
 .
 Lafcadio Hearn's papers at the Albert and Shirley Small Special Collections Library, University of Virginia
 Japan and the Japanese as Seen by Foreigners
 Lafcadio Hearn
 Two Years in the French West Indies From the Collections at the Library of Congress
 Lafcadio Hearn Correspondence digitized by Loyola University New Orleans
 
 
 

20th-century Buddhists
Greek Buddhists
Macedonian Buddhists
Irish Buddhists
Converts to Buddhism from Christianity
1850 births
1904 deaths
19th-century Irish writers
Alumni of Ushaw College
Collectors of fairy tales
Converts to Buddhism from Eastern Orthodoxy
English-language writers from Japan
Foreign advisors to the government in Meiji-period Japan
Former Greek Orthodox Christians
Ghost story writers
Greek people of Irish descent
Irish emigrants to Japan
Greek emigrants to the United States
Irish emigrants to the United States (before 1923)
Japanese folklorists
Japanese writers
Japanologists
Naturalized citizens of Japan
People from Lefkada
Academic staff of the University of Tokyo
Academic staff of Waseda University
The Cincinnati Enquirer people
Greek emigrants to Ireland
People from Rathmines
Mukoyōshi
Weird fiction writers